Kordian is a drama.

Kordian may also refer to:
Kordian, Fars, Iran
Kordian, Razavi Khorasan, Iran
Kordeyan, Tehran, Iran
Kordian District, in Fars Province, Iran